Catholic Central High School may refer to:
Burlington Catholic Central High School, Burlington, Wisconsin
Catholic Central High School (Grand Rapids, Michigan)
Catholic Central High School (Lethbridge, Alberta)
Catholic Central High School (London, Ontario)
Catholic Central High School (Marinette, Wisconsin)
Detroit Catholic Central High School, Novi, Michigan
Catholic Central School (Springfield, Ohio)
Steubenville Catholic Central High School, Ohio
Catholic Central High School (Troy, New York)
Catholic Central High School (Windsor, Ontario)
Catholic Central High School (Hammond, Indiana), now known as Bishop Noll Institute
 Catholic Central High School (Manistee, Michigan)

See also
 Central Catholic High School (disambiguation)